Passivation may refer to:

Passivation (chemistry)
Passivation (spacecraft)
Feedback passivation, a concept in nonlinear control